James Thomas Gallagher Jr. (born March 24, 1961) is an American professional golfer and sportscaster.

Gallagher was born in Johnstown, Pennsylvania. His father, a career club pro, started him in golf at age six. He attended the University of Tennessee in Knoxville. Gallagher turned pro in 1983 and joined the PGA Tour in 1984.

Gallagher won five events on the PGA Tour. His first win came in 1990 at the Greater Milwaukee Open. In 1993, he won twice: the Anheuser-Busch Golf Classic and The Tour Championship. He repeated his two-win performance in 1995 by winning the KMart Greater Greensboro Open and the FedEx St. Jude Classic. Gallagher's best finishes in a major championship were a 3rd-place finish at the 1991 PGA Championship, and a T-2 at the same tournament the following year. He was a member of the victorious 1993 Ryder Cup team and the 1994 Presidents Cup team.

Gallagher, who works as a golf analyst for Golf Channel, has appeared in a limited number of events on the Champions Tour since reaching age 50 in 2011. He had two top-10 finishes in this venue in both 2011 and 2013.

Gallagher comes from a golfing family: his father a career club pro in Marion, Indiana, his wife Cissye is a former LPGA Tour player, sister Jackie and brother Jeff are both touring professionals. He and Cissye have four children, Mary Langdon, Thomas, Kathleen, and Elizabeth, and live in Greenwood, Mississippi.  Kathleen plays golf at LSU.

Professional wins (9)

PGA Tour wins (5)

PGA Tour playoff record (1–1)

Other wins (4)
1983 Indiana Open
1985 Magnolia State Classic (PGA Tour Tournament Players Series), Charley Pride Golf Fiesta (PGA Tour Tournament Players Series)
1990 Jerry Ford Invitational (tie with Donnie Hammond and Andy North)

Results in major championships

CUT = missed the half-way cut
"T" indicates a tie for a place

Summary

Most consecutive cuts made – 6 (1995 U.S. Open – 1996 PGA)
Longest streak of top-10s – 1 (twice)

U.S. national team appearances
Four Tours World Championship: 1991
Ryder Cup: 1993 (winners)
Presidents Cup: 1994 (winners)

See also
1983 PGA Tour Qualifying School graduates

References

External links

American male golfers
Tennessee Volunteers men's golfers
PGA Tour golfers
PGA Tour Champions golfers
Ryder Cup competitors for the United States
Golf writers and broadcasters
Golfers from Pennsylvania
Golfers from Mississippi
Sportspeople from Johnstown, Pennsylvania
People from Greenwood, Mississippi
1961 births
Living people